The 1949 Syracuse Orangemen football team represented Syracuse University in the 1949 college football season. This was Syracuse's first season under head coach Ben Schwartzwalder, who would eventually coach at the school for 25 years and become Syracuse's all-time winningest coach. The Orangemen finished the season with a record of 4–5.

Schedule

References

Syracuse
Syracuse Orange football seasons
Syracuse Orangemen football